William James Lanyon (18 February 1906 – 1962) was a Welsh professional footballer who played as an outside-right. He played in the English Football League for Aberdare Athletic, Walsall and Wrexham.

References

1906 births
1962 deaths
Welsh footballers
Association football forwards
English Football League players
Aberdare Athletic F.C. players
Aberaman Athletic F.C. players
Portsmouth F.C. players
Walsall F.C. players
Peterborough & Fletton United F.C. players
Wrexham A.F.C. players